Joyride is the 13th studio album by contemporary Christian music singer Bryan Duncan.

Track listing 

source:

Personnel 

 Bryan Duncan – lead vocals, handclaps (7)
 Jim Hammerly – acoustic piano (1, 10), Hammond B3 organ (1)
 Blair Masters – keyboards (2, 4, 5, 7, 8, 9), keyboard programming (2), synthesizers (3), Wurlitzer electric piano (3), organ (10)
 Pat Coil – Hammond B3 organ (3, 8), acoustic piano (5, 6), organ (7)
 Mark Baldwin – track arrangements, guitars (1, 2, 3, 5, 6, 8, 9, 10), guitar programming (2), slide guitar solo (3), acoustic guitar (4), electric guitar (4), handclaps (7), backing vocals (8)
 Jackie Street – bass guitar (1–5, 7–10)
 Craig Nelson – string bass (6)
 John Hammond – drums (1, 2, 3, 5, 7, 8, 9), drum programming (1, 3, 5, 7, 8, 9)
 Steve Brewster – drums (4, 6, 10), drum programming (4)
 Eric Darken – additional drums (8), percussion (8, 9)
 Mark Douthit – saxophone (1, 4, 5, 9), EWI (4, 9)
 Chris McDonald – trombone (1), horn arrangements (1)
 Mike Haynes – trumpet (1, 4, 5)
 Chad Dickerson – backing vocals (1, 2)
 Darwin Hobbs – backing vocals (1, 2)
 Joy Lagana Chambley – backing vocals (1, 2)
 Tiffany Palmer – backing vocals (1, 2)
 Leanne Palmore – backing vocals (1, 2)
 Angela Primm – backing vocals (1, 2)
 Chance Scoggins – backing vocals (1, 2)
 Marcia Ware – backing vocals (1, 2)
 Aimee Joy Weimer – backing vocals (1, 2)
 Terry White – backing vocals (1, 2)
 Jerard Woods – backing vocals (1, 2)
 Jovaun Woods – backing vocals (1, 2)
 Lisa Bevill – backing vocals (3, 8)
 Gene Miller – backing vocals (3, 7)
 Chris Rodriguez – backing vocals (3, 7)
 Lisa Cochran – backing vocals (4, 5, 6)
 Marabeth Jordan – backing vocals (4, 5, 6)
 Ashley Cleveland – lead vocals (7)
 Bonnie Keen – backing vocals (8)
 Marty McCall – backing vocals (8)
 Donnie McClurkin – lead vocals (9)

Production

 Mark Baldwin – producer
 Dean Diehl –  executive producer
 George King –  executive producer
 John Jaszcz – recording and mixing at The Sound Kitchen, Franklin, Tennessee
 Grant Green – assistant engineer
 Rob Graves – remix arrangement
 Hank Williams – mastering at MasterMix, Nashville, Tennessee
 Scott Hughes – art direction
 Ron Roark – design
 Matthew Barnes – photography

References 

2000 albums
Bryan Duncan albums